The Swedish Agency for Economic and Regional Growth is a Swedish government agency organized under the Ministry of Enterprise, tasked to promote entrepreneurship and regional growth, and to implement structural funds programmes. The agency has broad mission. Some efforts are targeted directly to a specific company or prospective business; other times the aim is to influence and develop the business environment, often it's both. The agency has a mandate to manage and distribute funds from the European Social Fund and the European Regional Development Fund, to support projects that promote growth and jobs.

History
The agency was established in 2009, when the Swedish Business Development Agency and the Swedish National Rural Development Agency closed. Some work previously managed by the Swedish Consumer Agency was also transferred to the new agency.

Organisation
The agency has about 370 employees, nine local offices and headquarters in Stockholm. It is led by Director-General Gunilla Nordlöf.

See also
 Ministry of Enterprise, Energy and Communications (Sweden)

References

External links
Swedish Agency for Economic and Regional Growth - Official site

Government agencies of Sweden